ε-Carotene (epsilon-carotene) is a carotene. It can be synthesized from 2,7-dimethyl-2,4,6-octatrienedial and 2-methyl-4-(2,6,6-trimethyl-2-cyclohexen-1-yl)-3-butenal.

References 

Carotenoids
Cyclohexenes